Bollstanäs SK is a Swedish football club located in Upplands Väsby in Stockholm County.

Background
Bollstanäs Sportklubb was formed in May 1922 and is one of the largest sports clubs in the Greater Stockholm area running a total of 93 teams (82 of which are youth teams) in football, basketball, handball and bandy. The first sections were basketball for girls and football for boys. The club has around 2,000 members and the current breakdown of teams is as follows:

Men's Football
 27 youth teams
 2 senior teams

Ladies Football
 11 youth teams
 3 senior teams

Basketball
 16 youth teams
 2 senior teams

Handball
 13 youth teams
 2 senior teams

Bandy
 14 youth teams
 2 senior teams

Since their foundation Bollstanäs SK has participated mainly in the middle and lower divisions of the Swedish football league system.  The club currently plays in Division 3 Norra Svealand which is the fifth tier of Swedish football. They play their home matches at the Bollstanäs IP in Upplands Väsby.

Bollstanäs SK are affiliated to Stockholms Fotbollförbund.

Recent history
In recent seasons Bollstanäs SK have competed in the following divisions:

2011 – Division III, Norra Svealand
2010 – Division III, Norra Svealand
2009 – Division III, Norra Svealand
2008 – Division IV, Stockholm Norra
2007 – Division IV, Stockholm Norra
2006 – Division III, Norra Svealand
2005 – Division II, Östra Svealand
2004 – Division III, Norra Svealand
2003 – Division III, Norra Svealand
2002 – Division III, Norra Svealand
2001 – Division III, Norra Svealand
2000 – Division IV, Stockholm Norra
1999 – Division IV, Stockholm Norra

Attendances

In recent seasons Bollstanäs SK have had the following average attendances:

Footnotes

External links
 Bollstanäs SK – Official website
 Their official Youtube channel: 

Football clubs in Stockholm
Bandy clubs in Sweden
Basketball teams in Sweden
Association football clubs established in 1922
Bandy clubs established in 1922
Basketball teams established in 1922
1922 establishments in Sweden